Johan Price-Pejtersen (born 26 May 1999) is a Danish cyclist, who currently rides for UCI WorldTeam .

Major results

Road

2018
 1st Stage 5b (ITT) Olympia's Tour
 3rd Hafjell GP
2019
 1st  Time trial, UEC European Under-23 Championships
 1st  Time trial, National Under-23 Championships
 2nd Hafjell GP
 3rd Time trial, National Championships
2020
 2nd Time trial, National Under-23 Championships
2021
 1st  Time trial, UCI World Under-23 Championships
 1st  Time trial, UEC European Under-23 Championships
 1st  Time trial, National Under-23 Championships
 8th Overall L'Étoile d'Or

Track

2016
 1st  Team pursuit, National Championships
2017
 UCI World Junior Championships
1st  Individual pursuit
2nd  Team pursuit

References

External links

1999 births
Living people
Danish male cyclists
Sportspeople from Frederiksberg